The 2008 Cork Intermediate Hurling Championship was the 99th staging of the Cork Intermediate Hurling Championship since its establishment by the Cork County Board in 1909. The draw for the opening fixtures took place on 16 December 2007. The championship began on 2 May 2008 and ended on 12 October 2008.

On 12 October 2008, Carrigaline won the championship after a 1–13 to 0–10 defeat of Bandon in the final at Páirc Uí Chaoimh. This was their first ever championship title in this grade.

Bandon's Darren Crowley was the championship's top scorer with 0-36.

Team changes

To Championship

Promoted from the Cork Junior A Hurling Championship
 Barryroe

Relegated from the Cork Premier Intermediate Hurling Championship
 Delanys

From Championship

Promoted to the Cork Premier Intermediate Hurling Championship
 Fr. O'Neill's

Relegated to the City Junior A Hurling Championship
 Glen Rovers

Results

First round

Second round

Third round

Relegation playoffs

Quarter-finals

Semi-finals

Final

Championship statistics

Top scorers

Overall

In a single game

References

Cork Intermediate Hurling Championship
Cork Intermediate Hurling Championship